Bis(trimethylsilyl)peroxide (sometimes abbreviated as BTSP) is an organosilicon compound with the formula ((CH3)3SiO)2.  It is a colorless liquid that is soluble in organic solvents so long as they lack acidic groups.  The compound represents an aprotic analogue of hydrogen peroxide and as such it is used for certain sensitive organic oxidations. Upon treatment with organolithium compounds, it affords the silyl ether.

Preparation
It is prepared by treating trimethylsilyl chloride with the Hydrogen peroxide-urea complex.

References

Trimethylsilyl compounds
Organic peroxides
Reagents for organic chemistry
Oxidizing agents